The English Marriage is a 1934 German comedy film directed by Reinhold Schünzel and starring Renate Müller, Anton Walbrook and Adele Sandrock. A young German woman is engaged to marry a British aristocrat but has to win over his hostile family. It was based on a novel by Ludwig von Wohl.

The film's sets were designed by the art director Otto Hunte.

Cast
 Renate Müller as Gerte Winter
 Anton Walbrook as Warwick Brent
 Adele Sandrock as Lady Mavis
 Georg Alexander as Douglas Mavis, ihr Enkel
 Fritz Odemar as Percival, ihr Sohn
 Hans Richter as Tuck Mavis, ihr jüngster Enkel
 Hilde Hildebrand as  Bella Amery
 Etta Klingenberg as Roberta Buckley
 Gertrud Wolle as Lady Buckley
 Julius E. Herrmann as Sir Robert Buckley
 Hugo Werner-Kahle as Digby
 Gertrud de Lalsky as Gertes Mutter
 Anton Pointner
 Ewald Wenck
 Olga Engl
 Meta Jäger
 Else Reval

References

Bibliography
 Hake, Sabine. Popular cinema of the Third Reich. University of Texas Press, 2001.
 Strobl, Gerwin. The Germanic Isle: Nazi Perceptions of Britain. Cambridge University Press, 2000.

External links

1934 films
German comedy films
1930s German-language films
Films directed by Reinhold Schünzel
Films set in London
Films set in England
Films based on German novels
Films of Nazi Germany
Cine-Allianz films
German black-and-white films
1930s German films